Search Well is a historic home and farm complex located at Burtner, Washington County, Maryland, United States. It includes a limestone farmhouse dating from about 1800, a smokehouse and a bake house, a 2-story secondary dwelling used to house slaves or hired help, and a stone spring house.

It was listed on the National Register of Historic Places in 1983.

References

External links
, including photo from 1975, at Maryland Historical Trust

Houses on the National Register of Historic Places in Maryland
Houses completed in 1800
Houses in Washington County, Maryland
National Register of Historic Places in Washington County, Maryland